Liptena subundularis is a butterfly in the family Lycaenidae. It is found in Cameroon, Bioko and Gabon.

References

Butterflies described in 1892
Liptena
Butterflies of Africa